Coast to Coast is the fifth studio album by the guitarist Steve Morse, released on June 9, 1992, by MCA Records. The album reached No. 30 on the Billboard Heatseekers chart.

Critical reception

Daniel Gioffre at AllMusic gave Coast to Coast four stars out of five, calling it "a fine offering from a talented and overlooked musician and songwriter." Praise was given to Morse for "using all of the tools in his sizeable vocabulary" and for songs that "exhibit a wide variety of musical influences."

Track listing

Personnel
Steve Morse – guitar, arrangement, engineering, mixing, production
Van Romaine – drums, arrangement
Dave LaRue – bass, arrangement, engineering, mixing, production
Rick Sandidge – mixing, mastering
Glen Meadows – mastering

Chart performance

References

External links
In Review: Steve Morse Band "Coast To Coast" at Guitar Nine Records

Steve Morse albums
1992 albums
MCA Records albums